Dyckia distachya is a plant species in the genus Dyckia. This species is native to Paraguay and Brazil.

References

distachya
Flora of Brazil
Flora of Paraguay
Plants described in 1919